Utyashino (Ütäş) is a rural locality (a village) in Kubiyazovsky Selsoviet, Askinsky District, Bashkortostan, Russia. The population was 182 as of 2010. There are 5 streets.

Geography 
Utyashino is located 18 km east of Askino (the district's administrative centre) by road. Kubiyazy is the nearest rural locality.

References 

Rural localities in Askinsky District